BlackArts Racing Team (BAR) is a China / Hong Kong registered motor racing team that was formed in January, 2015. Its main operational headquarters is located within the Zhuhai International Circuit, in Zhuhai, Guangdong Province bordering Macau.
The teams business operations predominantly focus on professional racing series in Asia including F3 Asian Championship,  Asian Formula Renault Series/AFR Series, Circuit Hero Series, China Formula 4 Championship, and TCR Asia Series. The team also provides year-round beginning and advanced driver training via racing schools, individual driver training, and corporate track days.

The team's most notable achievements include winning the Driver and Team Championships in the 2015-2018 Asia Formula Renault Series.

History
The BlackArts Racing (BAR) team was founded by a group of four entrepreneurs, business professionals and senior executives in January 2015.

Team Highlights:

2015: A group of successful International entrepreneurs create BAR  to compete in the Asia Formula Renault Series and Circuit Hero Series.

Asia Formula Renault  - 12 races with 12 Class A Wins - Driver's Champion and 2nd Runner Up; Team Champion
  
Circuit Hero Series [Pan Delta Super Racing Festival] - 18 BAR podiums in 6 races - Champions, Class A and C

KL GP
BAR 10th overall and 4th in the GT4 Class in the first ever KL GP
 
Macau GP 
Three BAR drivers in two divisions, including the F3 GP

2016:
 
Circuit Hero 500 km 
Winner, Class A; Double Podiums Formula Enduro

Asia Formula Renault - 12 races with 7 Class A Wins - Class A Driver's Champion; Team Champion

2017

Asia Formula Renault Driver's Champion Class A, Class B; Team Champion

FIA China F4 Driver's Champion; Team Champion

2018

Asia Formula Renault Class A Driver's Champion; Team Champion

FIA China F4 Team Champion

Racing School

The Racing School is a formal driver training course recognized by the Hong Kong Automobile Association (HKAA), able to issue race license certificates through its one-day and two day courses. 
The Racing School is available to both newer and experienced drivers.
BAR also conducts an annual Advanced Training Course with the assistance of professional engineers and coaches such as LeMans Champions Richard Bradley (racing driver), Danny Watts, etc.
The Racing School is conducted with both formula cars Formula Renault and touring cars Volkswagen Scirocco R-Cup.

Current Series Results

F3 Asian Championship/Formula Regional Asian Championship

F4 Chinese Championship

Timeline

External links 
 http://www.blackartsracing.com/ BlackArts Racing Team - Official website
 http://frdsports.com/en/AFR/ Asia Formula Renault - Official website
 https://web.archive.org/web/20061224175706/http://www.zic.com.cn/ Zhuhai International Circuit - Official website
 http://www.facebook.com/BlackArtsRacingBAR - BAR Facebook page

References 

  “TCR Asia Reveals Drivers”. TCR-Series.com 27 April 2016. Bill O’Brien talks about co-founding BAR and racing in TCR
  “Burdon to contest 2016 Asia Formula Renault Series.” Cams.com.au. Josh Burdon to contest 2016 AFR Series with BlackArts Racing after successful winter testing
  “Burdon racing towards Asia Formula Renault crown”  Speedcafe.com 27 October 2016. Josh Burdon set to win 2016 Asia Formula Renault Series for BlackArts Racing
  “Dream Team within reach of Hong Kong formula racing fans.”  Ejisight.com 5 Aug, 2015 Dan Wells of BlackArts Racing offers racing internship contest while leading AFR championship

Chinese auto racing teams
2015 establishments in China
Auto racing teams established in 2015
Formula Renault teams
Racing schools
Hong Kong auto racing teams
Formula Regional teams